Achoerodus is a genus of wrasses collectively known as blue gropers. They are found in the coastal waters of southern Australia and distinguished by the bright blue colouring of the adult males. 

The thick-bodied blue gropers have peg teeth, heavy scales, large tails and thick lips. Juveniles are brown to green brown. Adult females are brown to greenish-yellow. Each scale may have a darker red spot. The adult males have the bright blue colouring that give the fish their name. The blue can range from deep navy to cobalt blue, and there may also be darker or yellow-orange spots or lines around the eyes.

All blue gropers begin life as females. As they mature, they go through an initial phase, in which they may be male or female, before developing their adult colouring and reaching the terminal phase.

Typically you will only find one or two male blue gropers in an area, with a larger number of the female gropers in the same area. Should the dominant male blue groper die, the largest female will grow, change colour and sex, and become the dominant male.

In Australia certain states like New South Wales have granted protection to this species. It's considered the state fish symbol for the territory and it is illegal to spear blue groper. There is also a limitation on fishing for them with a line. They are extremely inquisitive, and while it is now discouraged to feed them by cutting up urchins, they still will approach divers as if expecting to be fed. Their lifespan is said to be up to 35 years according to some sources, longer according to others.

The fish live in a variety of coastal waters, especially exposed reefs.

In 1998, the eastern blue groper was made the state fish emblem of New South Wales.

Species
The currently recognized species in this genus are:
 Achoerodus gouldii (J. Richardson, 1843) (western blue groper)
 Achoerodus viridis (Steindachner, 1866) (eastern blue groper)

References

External links
Fisheries Western Australia - Western Blue Groper Fact Sheet
Video: Domain of the Blue Groper
Bega News - Blue groper seized in surveillance operation 

 
Labridae
 
Taxa named by Theodore Gill